Bayfront/E Street station (also known as E Street station) is a station on the Blue Line of the San Diego Trolley located in the city of Chula Vista, California. The stop serves both as a commuter center with a park and ride lot and to provide access to the dense nearby retail area.

History
Bayfront/E Street station was the first infill station of the San Diego Trolley system, opening on the Blue Line in October 1986, five years after the line's inauguration in July 1981. The station sits on the main line tracks of the San Diego and Arizona Eastern Railway.

This station was renovated, starting January 3, 2014 as part of the Trolley Renewal Project; it reopened with a renovated station platform in October 2014.

Station layout
There are two tracks, each with a side platform.

See also
 List of San Diego Trolley stations

References

Blue Line (San Diego Trolley)
Railway stations in the United States opened in 1985
San Diego Trolley stations
Transportation in Chula Vista, California
Buildings and structures in Chula Vista, California
1985 establishments in California